Livingstone Alleyne (born 18 February 1971) is a Barbadian former cyclist. He competed in two events at the 1992 Summer Olympics.

References

External links
 

1971 births
Living people
Barbadian male cyclists
Olympic cyclists of Barbados
Cyclists at the 1992 Summer Olympics